An examination table (or exam table) is used to support patients during medical examinations. During these exams, doctors in offices (UK: surgeries), clinics and hospitals use an adjusting mechanism to manipulate and position the table to allow patient support, closer examination of a portion or the entire patient, and the ability to move the patient on and off the table safely. Examination tables often have rolls of paper which the patient sits or lies on, to protect the table. The paper is normally discarded after each patient uses the table.

Examination tables have included electric motors since the 1970s. These are fitted underneath the tabletop and power cables generally detach to prevent a tripping hazard. The ability to transfer power forward and backwards using a reversible electric motor means greater mobility of the examination table.

See also
 Medical facility
 Operating table
 Ambulatory care

References

Further reading
 Australian Nursing Federation Non lifting policy
 Art Project Narratives on a Gynaecological Exam Table 
 RACGP regulations for OH&S criterion on examination tables

Medical equipment
Tables (furniture)